Ambon Bay Festival is an annual event held at Ambon Bay and across West Seram Regency, Maluku, Indonesia at the end of September. The festival aims to promote national and international tourism to the Maluku Islands. It has been held since 2006.

References

Ambon, Maluku
Tourist attractions in Indonesia
Festivals in Indonesia